Cali Connection is the 11th studio album by American rapper C-Bo, released February 28, 2012, on Ca$hville Records, West Coast Mafia Records and Black October Music. The album features guest performances by Outlawz, Young Buck, T-Nutty, 2:Eleven and more.

Track listing

References

2012 albums
C-Bo albums